| children        = Chantelle Vincent, Rasiah Vincent 

Jarret Lloyd Vincent (12 February 1950 – 17 November 2000), better known by one of his stage aliases Bim Sherman (others include Jarrett Tomlinson, Jarrett Vincent, Lloyd Vincent, J. L. Vincent, Bim Shieman and Lloyd Tomlinson), was a Jamaican musician and singer-songwriter.

Biography
Rooted in reggae, his music developed in later years in many directions, combining influences from all around the world, notably India. Sherman was also hailed as "reggae's sweetest voice". In the mid 1970s, he recorded a small body of roots tunes as a young struggling singer in Jamaica. He later moved to London where, as part of the post-punk reggae infatuation, he made a name for himself recording with Adrian Sherwood's On-U Sound label. He became part of various musical collectives associated with On-U Sound, such as New Age Steppers (alongside Ari Up, formerly of The Slits), Singers & Players (with Congo Ashanti Roy and the late Prince Far-I ), Dub Syndicate and Justice League of Zion.

Sherman also recorded a handful of solo reggae LPs. Towards the end of his life, Bim Sherman took a whole new musical direction. He went to India and re-recorded his classic 70s roots tunes alongside a full Indian classical orchestra in Bombay, creating his masterpiece LP, Miracle. This opened Sherman up to an entire new audience and he seemed at last to be emerging from the reggae underworld. It Must Be A Dream, an entire remix of Miracle was released with dance mixes by top UK DJs, followed by another notable Indian/reggae crossover LP What Happened? Bim Sherman was diagnosed with cancer and died in November 2000, within weeks of his diagnosis. He received an obituary in The Times, a rare accolade for an underground reggae singer.

Discography

Albums
 1979: Lovers Leap Showcase
 1978: Love Forever
 1982: Across the Red Sea
 1984: Danger
 1988: Ghetto Dub
 1989: Exploitation
 1990: Matrix Dub
 1990: Too Hot
 1991: Got to Move Pt. 2
 1992: Crazy World
 1996: Miracle
 1997: It Must Be a Dream
 1998: What Happened
 2002: The Need to Live

Singles
 1975: "Tribulation"
 1975: "Golden Stool"
 1975: "Valley of Tears"
 1975: "100 Years"
 1975: "Trying"
 1976: "My Brethren"
 1977: "Mighty Ruler"
 1977: "Ever Firm"
 1979: "Golden Locks / Tribulation"
 1979: "Lightning and Thunder"
 1979: "My Woman"
 1979: "Love Jah Only"
 1983: "Happiness / Exile Dub"
 1989: "The Power"
 1993: "Winey Winey"
 1996: "Solid As a Rock"
 1996: "Bewildered"
 1997: "It Must Be a Dream"
 1997: "Can I Be Free from Crying"
 1998: "Earth People"
 1998: "Heaven"

References

External links
 Discography at unofficial On-U Sound website
 Profile at unofficial On-U Sound website
 Discography at discogs.com
 Interview with Adrian ONU Sherwood discussing Bim Sherman's work 

Jamaican reggae musicians
1950 births
2000 deaths
People from Westmoreland Parish
On-U Sound Records artists
20th-century Jamaican male singers